Glemanserin (INN) (developmental code name MDL-11,939) is a drug which acts as a potent and selective 5-HT2A receptor antagonist. The first truly selective 5-HT2A ligand to be discovered, glemanserin resulted in the development of the widely used and even more potent and selective 5-HT2A receptor antagonist volinanserin (MDL-100,907), which is a fluorinated analogue. Though it was largely superseded in scientific research by volinanserin, glemanserin was investigated clinically for the treatment of generalized anxiety disorder. However, it was ultimately found to be ineffective and was not marketed.

See also
 Volinanserin
 Pruvanserin
 Roluperidone
 Lenperone
 Lidanserin

References

5-HT2A antagonists
Secondary alcohols
Phenol ethers
Piperidines